The Tumansky M-88 was an air-cooled radial engine for aircraft developed in the Soviet Union shortly before World War II.

Design and development
The M-88 was designed to address the shortcomings of the Tumansky M-87.  The improvements incorporated in the M-88 were a strengthened crankcase, crankshaft, connecting rods, waffle ribbing at the piston bottom and a two speed geared centrifugal supercharger.  The M-88 retained the same bore/stroke and displacement as the M-87 while increasing power to 1,000-1,150 hp.  Design work began in 1937 and by 1939 the first prototypes were being flight tested in the Polikarpov I-180 fighter prototypes.  At first the M-88 was not a success, but the designers persisted and the M-88 was made into a reliable and widely produced engine.  There were a number of different variants with the most numerous being the M-88B, of which 10,585 were produced at Zaporozhye and Omsk.  The M-88B solved most of the mechanical failures associated with the M-87 and early M-88's by including oil injectors in the crankshaft, improved cooling and strengthened drive components.  16,087 M-88's were produced.  In hindsight, the Tumansky family of engines developed from the Gnome-Rhône 9K and Gnome-Rhône 14K were far less successful than the Shvetsov family of engines developed from the Wright R-1820.

Applications
 Ilyushin Il-4
 Neman R-10
 Polikarpov I-180 
 Sukhoi Su-2

Specifications (Tumansky M-88B)

See also

References

Aircraft air-cooled radial piston engines
1930s aircraft piston engines
Tumansky aircraft engines